Disappointment Peak may refer to:

 Disappointment Peak (California) near West Bishop, California
 Disappointment Peak (Washington) in the North Cascades in Washington state
 Disappointment Peak (Wyoming) in the Teton Range of Wyoming

See also
 Mount Disappointment (disambiguation)